8964 is a code referring to the 1989 Tiananmen Square protests and massacre.

8964 may also refer to:
 8964 (number), a number.
 8964 Corax, a minor planet.
 A year in the 9th millennium.